Papa Abdoulaye Mbaye (born 13 June 1990), commonly known as Ablaye Mbaye, is a Senegalese professional basketball player for Club Melilla Baloncesto of the LEB Oro. Born in Yeumbeul, Senegal, he also holds Spanish citizenship.

Career

FC Barcelona

Played for Arona Basket Sur at Canary Islands before enter the FC Barcelona Bàsquet junior team on 2007. Nike International Junior Tournament runner-up in 2008, scoring 11 points and grabbing 9 rebounds in the final game against FMP.

In 2008 and 2009 was loaned to Unió Sabadell and CB Cornellà, both farm teams of FC Barcelona Bàsquet. Being a reserve team member, made his professional debut on 12 October 2011, playing 3 minutes for FC Barcelona Bàsquet on a Liga ACB game against CB Estudiantes. He played two more games on 2011–12 season, becoming League champion. Made his EuroLeague debut on 12 May 2013, playing 5 minutes in the Final Four game against CSKA Moscow.

In June 2016 terminated his contract, after six seasons playing for the reserve team on LEB Oro and LEB Plata.

Força Lleida

On 7 August 2016, signed for LEB Oro side Força Lleida.

National team

Mbaye played for the Senegalese men's national team on the 2008 FIBA Africa Under-18 Championship.

References

External links
ACB profile 
FEB profile 

1990 births
Living people
Senegalese expatriate basketball people in Spain
Senegalese men's basketball players
FC Barcelona Bàsquet players
Força Lleida CE players
Liga ACB players
Centers (basketball)
Undrafted National Basketball Association players
People from Dakar Region